Morgaushsky District (Murkaş rayonĕ) is an administrative and municipal district (raion), one of the twenty-one in the Chuvash Republic, Russia. It is located in the north of the republic and borders with the Mari El Republic in the north, Cheboksarsky District in the east, Alikovsky District in the south, and with Yadrinsky District in the west. Its administrative center is the rural locality (a selo) of Morgaushi. Population:

History
The district was formed on February 10, 1944.

Notable residents 

Vera Sokolova (born 1987 in Solianoy), race walker

References

Notes

Sources

Districts of Chuvashia